Ngoepe is a surname of South African origin. Notable people with the name include:

 Bernard Ngoepe (born 1947), South African judge
 Gift Ngoepe (born 1990), South African baseball infielder
 Lesiba Ngoepe (born 1993), South African cricketer
 Samson Ngoepe (born 1985), South African runner who specializes in the 800 metres